Christopher Kellan Beardsley (born 28 February 1984) is an English former professional footballer who played as a striker. He is the fitness coach at  club Burton Albion.

Beardsley played youth football with Mickleover Sports and Derby County before starting his senior career with Mansfield Town. He broke into the first team in December 2002, and spent a brief period on loan at Worksop Town in the 2003–04 season. He left Mansfield in June 2004 and joined Doncaster Rovers a month later. He failed to make an impact, and signed for Kidderminster Harriers in December 2004. He rejoined Mansfield in July 2005, but did not play regularly in his one-and-a-half-year stay, and was loaned out to Conference National club Rushden & Diamonds in January 2007. He signed for the club permanently later that month, but struggled for appearances after a change in management. Beardsley joined York City in June 2007, but suffered a broken jaw in a match against Grays Athletic, and failed to establish himself in the team. He joined Kettering Town in December 2007, initially on loan, and helped the club win promotion to the Conference Premier during the 2007–08 season.

He rejoined Kidderminster on loan in November 2008, making a handful of appearances before being released by Kettering in May 2009. He signed for Stevenage Borough later that month, and helped them earn promotion to League Two in the 2009–10 season. Beardsley was part of the team that earned promotion to League One after winning the 2010–11 League Two play-offs. He left Stevenage when his contract expired in June 2012, and signed for Preston North End two months later. He struggled for appearances after a change in management, and spent most of the 2013–14 season on loan with Bristol Rovers. Beardsley returned to Stevenage in July 2014, and helped them to the 2014–15 League Two play-offs. After being released in May 2015, he started a third spell with Mansfield a month later, where he stayed for one season before his release in May 2016. He joined club Burton Albion as a fitness coach in July 2016, and took charge for one match as caretaker manager in January 2021.

Early life
He was born in Derby, Derbyshire and attended Allestree Woodlands School from 1995 to 2000 and The Manor Academy from 2000 to 2003.

Career

Early career
Beardsley played junior football for Mickleover Sports and aged 11 joined the youth system of hometown club Derby County, where he stayed for five years. He joined Mansfield Town's youth system on a three-year scholarship in June 2000 after leaving school. He missed the second year of his scholarship from a double stress fracture in his back, but within six months of returning to full training made his first-team debut aged 18 as a 57th-minute substitute in a 1–0 away defeat to Brentford on 28 December 2002. Beardsley made five appearances in the 2002–03 season, after which Mansfield were relegated to the Third Division with a 23rd-place finish in the Second Division. He signed a one-year professional contract with the club on 4 July 2003. His first career goal came with a header in Mansfield's 2–0 away win over York City on 11 October 2003.

In January 2004, Beardsley was sent on a one-month loan to Northern Premier League Premier Division club Worksop Town, who had tried to sign him at the start of the 2003–04 season. He made his debut in Worksop's 4–1 home win against Radcliffe Borough on 17 January 2004, in which he was substituted on 80 minutes. In the following match, Beardsley scored the only goal of a 1–0 home win against Blyth Spartans on 7 February 2004 with a volley. His fourth and final appearance for Worksop came in a 1–1 home draw with Whitby Town, playing 76 minutes before being substituted. Beardsley made 17 appearances and scored once for Mansfield during the 2003–04 season, in which they finished in fifth place in the Third Division. He was released by the club in June 2004.

Doncaster Rovers and Kidderminster Harriers
Beardsley joined newly promoted League One club Doncaster Rovers on 19 July 2004 after a successful trial. He debuted in their 4–3 away loss to Brentford on 10 August 2004, which he entered as a 79th-minute substitute. His only goal for Doncaster came after being assisted by Ben Jackson in the 77th minute of a 1–0 away win over Lincoln City in the Football League Trophy on 28 September 2014. Having struggled to establish himself at Doncaster, Beardsley moved to Kidderminster Harriers of League Two on 9 December 2004 on a contract until the end of the 2004–05 season. He made his debut two days later as a 78th-minute substitute in a 2–1 home win over Rochdale. Beardsley scored his first goal for Kidderminster with a close-range finish in their 3–1 home defeat to Southend United on 3 January 2005. He played 25 times for Kidderminster, scoring 5 goals, but they were relegated to the Conference National after ranking in 23rd place in League Two. He was offered a new one-year contract with the club in May 2005.

Return to Mansfield and Rushden & Diamonds
Beardsley's former club Mansfield spoke to him about re-signing for them in May 2005, although Kidderminster demanded a £5,000 fee for him, half of which would go his former club Doncaster. He eventually joined Mansfield, now playing in League Two, on 5 August 2005 for a nominal fee. He debuted as an 82nd-minute substitute in their 3–0 home win over Torquay United on 13 August 2005. His 2005–06 season came to an end during a 3–2 home defeat to local rivals Notts County on 29 August 2005, when he collided with goalkeeper Kevin Pilkington and broke his leg. Beardsley had made four appearances that season, which Mansfield finished in 16th place in League Two. He returned to the team almost a year later, on 12 August 2006, as an 88th-minute substitute in a 1–1 home draw with Stockport County. His first two goals of the 2006–07 season came in Mansfield's 3–0 Football League Trophy home victory against Grimsby Town on 31 October 2006.

As he was not playing regularly for Mansfield, Beardsley joined Conference National club Rushden & Diamonds on 19 January 2007 on a one-month loan. He made his debut a day later, when starting in Rushden's 2–1 home victory against Stafford Rangers, and scored his first goal in the following match, with a 75th-minute header in a 3–1 home win over Cambridge United. Having helped Rushden move up the table with two goals from three matches, he signed for the club permanently on 31 January 2007 on a one-and-a-half-year contract on a free transfer. He finished 2006–07 with 13 appearances and 2 goals for Rushden, as they finished the season in 12th place in the Conference National. He was released by the club in May 2007 following a change in management.

York City and Kettering Town

Beardsley was signed by Conference Premier club York City on 19 June 2007, to provide competition for Richard Brodie, Craig Farrell and Onome Sodje. He made his debut as a starter in their 2–1 home defeat to Cambridge on 11 August 2007, in which he was substituted on 62 minutes. Despite struggling for a place in the team, Beardsley turned down a loan move to Conference North club Tamworth in September 2007, in order to prove his worth at York. He suffered a broken jaw in two places during York's 2–0 away win over Grays Athletic on 22 September 2007, after being elbowed by Jamie Stuart in an off-the-ball incident, which was likely to rule Beardsley out for at least three months. Essex Police confirmed they were making enquiries following the incident. Beardsley returned to the team as a 73rd-minute substitute in York's 1–1 home draw with Crawley Town on 1 December 2007. He finished his York career with nine appearances.

To aid his return from injury, Beardsley joined Conference North club Kettering Town on 31 December 2007 on a one-month loan. He made an immediate impact, scoring two goals in a 6–1 home win over Solihull Moors a day later, after which he was praised in the Northamptonshire Evening Telegraph for a "magnificent debut performance". Beardsley continued his scoring form, and had scored five goals from five appearances by the time he joined Kettering permanently on 28 January 2008 on a one-and-a-half-year contract on a free transfer. He played in all of Kettering's remaining fixtures in the 2007–08 season, which he completed with 11 goals from 22 appearances, as the club was promoted to the Conference Premier as Conference North champions.

Beardsley featured regularly for Kettering at the start of the 2008–09 season, and scored his first goal of the season after turning in Jean-Paul Marna's cross in the 82nd minute of a 2–0 away win over Cambridge on 25 August 2008. Having scored four goals in the first two months of 2008–09, he rejoined former club Kidderminster on 27 November 2008 on a one-month loan, with a view to a permanent transfer. He debuted as an 80th-minute substitute in a 3–2 home victory against Salisbury City on 6 December 2008. Beardsley made three appearances while on loan at Kidderminster, and returned to Kettering after being recalled in January 2009. Only weeks after returning, he entered Kettering's 4–2 home loss to Premier League team Fulham in the FA Cup on 24 January 2009 as a 73rd-minute substitute. Beardsley featured mostly as a substitute over the remainder of 2008–09, which he finished with 44 appearances and 5 goals for Kettering. They finished in eighth place in the Conference Premier, and Beardsley was released by the club in May 2009.

Stevenage

He signed for Conference Premier club Stevenage Borough on 27 May 2009 on a one-year contract, reuniting him with manager Graham Westley, who had previously signed Beardsley for Rushden. He made a scoring debut in Stevenage's 3–0 home victory over Ebbsfleet United on 18 August 2009, with a shot from 12 yards in the eighth-minute. Beardsley featured regularly in the first half of the 2009–10 season, but scored only three goals before the Christmas period, in which he scored twice in two matches against Cambridge. In the first match on 26 December 2009, he scored with a shot from Ronnie Henry's cross in the 85th minute of a 3–1 away win, and in the second match on 1 January 2010, his goal was assisted by Yemi Odubade, as Stevenage won 4–1 at home. The latter result saw Stevenage move to the top of the Conference Premier table. Beardsley's goal tally reached double figures when he scored twice in a 5–1 away win over Kidderminster in the FA Trophy semi-final first leg on 13 March 2010. He started in the final at Wembley Stadium on 8 May 2010, being substituted on 66 minutes, as Stevenage were beaten 2–1 after extra time by Barrow. His 2009–10 season was successful, with Beardsley scoring 10 times from 45 appearances as Stevenage won promotion to League Two after winning the Conference Premier championship. This was the first time in the club's history that Stevenage had been promoted to the Football League.

He made his first appearance of the 2010–11 season in Stevenage's first ever Football League fixture, coming on as a 60th-minute substitute in a 2–2 home draw against Macclesfield Town on 7 August 2010. He scored his first goal of the season in the 50th minute of a 1–1 draw away to Aldershot Town on 28 August 2010, after finishing from Odubade's flick-on. Beardsley suffered a dislocated shoulder in Stevenage's 1–0 home loss to Brentford in the Football League Trophy on 31 August 2010, consequently ruling him out of the team for six weeks. He returned to the team on 16 November 2010, starting the FA Cup win against Milton Keynes Dons, before being substituted in the 81st minute. Stevenage qualified for the play-offs with a sixth-place finish in League Two, and Beardsley scored his second goal of 2010–11 in the second leg 1–0 win away to Accrington Stanley on 20 May 2011. Beardsley's goal was scored in the 90th minute with a shot into the bottom left corner, having come on as a 77th-minute substitute, and ensured Stevenage won the tie 3–0 on aggregate. He came on as an 85th-minute substitute in the final on 28 May 2011, as Stevenage beat Torquay 1–0 at Old Trafford to earn promotion to League One. Beardsley made 32 appearances during the club's first season in the Football League, scoring 2 goals.

Beardsley made his first appearance of the 2011–12 season as a 95th-minute substitute in a 4–3 extra-time defeat at home to Peterborough United in the League Cup, scoring Stevenage's third goal with a header on 117 minutes, although they lost 4–3. He scored twice in Stevenage's 3–0 away win over Stourbridge in the FA Cup on 3 December 2011, scoring the club's first two goals of the match midway through the second half, to ensure Stevenage progressed to the third round for the second consecutive season. Recurring hamstring injuries meant Beardsley struggled for appearances during the second half of the season, scoring one further goal on the last day of the regular season, with a 20-yard shot in a 3–0 home win over Bury on 5 May 2012. With a sixth-place finish in League One, Stevenage qualified for the play-offs, and faced Sheffield United in the semi-final. Beardsley featured in the second leg 1–0 away defeat as a 63rd-minute substitute, as Stevenage were eliminated 1–0 on aggregate. He scored 10 times in 40 appearances during 2011–12, and was Stevenage's top scorer for the season. In June 2012, Beardsley left Stevenage after he failed to agree a new contract with the club.

Preston North End
Beardsley signed for League One club Preston North End on 12 August 2012 on a free transfer, linking up again with manager Graham Westley. He had spent the pre-season ahead of the 2012–13 season training with the club, although the transfer had been held up while the club waited for confirmation from the Football League in accordance with new financial fair play rules. Beardsley made his Preston debut in a 2–0 home win over Huddersfield Town in the League Cup on 14 August 2012, assisting the club's second goal of the match, with his low cross being scored by Nicky Wroe. He scored his first goal for Preston on 4 September 2012 after converting David Amoo's cross in the third-minute of their 1–1 away draw with Carlisle United in the Football League Trophy, a tie that Preston won 3–1 on penalties. Beardsley scored one further goal that month, heading in Jeffrey Monakana's cross on 64 minutes as Preston came from behind to beat Yeovil Town 3–2 at home. It proved to be Beardsley's last goal for five months, ending his goal drought in a 3–1 away loss to Yeovil on 12 February 2013, in what was Westley's last match in charge of the club. Beardsley made just two appearances under new manager Simon Grayson over the remainder of the season, both as a second-half substitute. Shortly after the season ended, he was told he could leave Preston if a suitable offer was received. He made 22 appearances during the 2012–13 season, scoring 3 times, as Preston ranked in 14th place in League One.

Having failed to make an appearance for Preston at the start of the 2013–14 season, Beardsley joined League Two club Bristol Rovers on a one-month loan on 31 October 2013. He debuted two days later when starting Rovers' 1–0 away defeat to Oxford United, in which he was substituted in the 86th minute. His first goal for the club came in his next appearance, with a header in a 3–3 home draw with York in the FA Cup on 8 November 2015. Having scored two goals from four appearances, Beardsley's loan was extended on 22 November 2013, with the new agreement running until 5 January 2014. Just a day later, he was red carded for a late tackle in Rovers' 1–0 away defeat to Burton Albion, for which he received a one-match suspension. His loan was extended once more on 6 January 2014, until the end of the 2013–14 season, as manager John Ward felt that "Up front Chris gives a little bit more". Beardsley finished the loan with 28 appearances and 3 goals, while Rovers were relegated to the Conference Premier with a 23rd-place finish in League Two. He was released by Preston in May 2014.

Return to Stevenage and third spell with Mansfield
Beardsley was reunited with Westley when re-signing for Stevenage, now playing in League Two, on 12 July 2014. He missed the start of the 2014–15 season through injury, and only made his debut on 16 September 2014 as a starter in Stevenage's 2–1 away defeat to Bury, in which he was substituted on 62 minutes. Beardsley's first goal came in a 3–2 away defeat to Portsmouth on 21 October 2014, after latching on to a Joe Devera back-header and scoring in the 74th minute. After scoring twice in Stevenage's 5–1 home win over Cheltenham Town on 15 November 2014 he endured a five-month goal drought, his next goal coming with a close-range 89th-minute equaliser in a 2–2 draw away to Accrington on 18 April 2015. Stevenage qualified for the play-offs with a sixth-place finish in League Two, with Southend their opponents in the semi-final. Beardsley started both matches, but Stevenage were eliminated 4–2 on aggregate, ending his season on 32 appearances and 4 goals. He was released by the club in May 2015, but was praised by chairman Phil Wallace, who commented that Beardsley had "proved key to Stevenage establishing itself as a Football League club under Graham Westley".

He re-signed for Mansfield on 5 June 2015, starting a third spell with the League Two club. His debut came after starting a 4–1 away defeat to Sheffield Wednesday in the League Cup on 11 August 2015. He played regularly at the start of the 2015–16 season, but had a spell out of the team with a stress fracture in his shin. He suffered a broken nose on his return as an 89th-minute substitute in a 3–1 away win over Barnet on 28 November 2015, and continued to struggle with his shin injury. Beardsley's first Mansfield goal in over nine years came on 30 January 2016 with a header from Mal Benning's corner on 60 minutes in a 1–0 away victory over Crawley. He finished the 2015–16 season with 16 appearances and 1 goal as Mansfield ranked in 12th place in League Two. He was released by the club in May 2016.

Style of play
Beardsley played as a striker, and was described by his Stevenage teammate Mark Roberts as the "perfect man to lead the line", because of his work ethic.

Coaching career
Beardsley moved into coaching when being appointed the fitness coach at newly promoted Championship club Burton Albion on 7 July 2016. He registered as a player at the club in August 2018 and made one appearance in the 2018–19 season, as an 89th-minute substitute in a 2–2 draw away to Portsmouth on 23 October. He was in joint caretaker charge, alongside Nick Fenton, for Burton's 5–1 home defeat to Oxford on 2 January 2021.

Personal life
Beardsley studied sports journalism at Staffordshire University from 2008 to 2010, graduating with a first-class honours degree. He also wrote frequently for a local newspaper in Stevenage. He supports his hometown club, Derby County.

Career statistics

Managerial statistics

Honours
Kettering Town
Conference North: 2007–08

Stevenage
Conference Premier: 2009–10
FA Trophy runner-up: 2009–10
Football League Two play-offs: 2011

References

External links

Profile at the Burton Albion F.C. website

1984 births
Living people
Footballers from Derby
English footballers
Association football forwards
Mickleover Sports F.C. players
Derby County F.C. players
Mansfield Town F.C. players
Worksop Town F.C. players
Doncaster Rovers F.C. players
Kidderminster Harriers F.C. players
Rushden & Diamonds F.C. players
York City F.C. players
Kettering Town F.C. players
Stevenage F.C. players
Preston North End F.C. players
Bristol Rovers F.C. players
Burton Albion F.C. players
English Football League players
Northern Premier League players
National League (English football) players
English football managers
Burton Albion F.C. managers
English Football League managers
Association football coaches
Burton Albion F.C. non-playing staff
Alumni of Staffordshire University